Last of Seven is the debut studio album by Pat Monahan, lead singer of the band Train. The album was released on September 18, 2007. Notable guest appearances include Brandi Carlile, who joins Monahan on the ballad, "Pirate on the Run," while Graham Nash sings backup on "Cowboys and Indians," and Bon Jovi guitarist Richie Sambora plays on "Someday."

The album's first single, "Her Eyes", was released to radio in July 2007. It has received some airplay on satellite radio stations, The Pulse on Sirius, and Flight 26 on XM. Monahan performed the song with his touring band on The Tonight Show with Jay Leno on October 2, 2007.

Track listing

Charts

Album

Singles

References

2007 debut albums
Patrick Monahan albums
Albums produced by Patrick Leonard
Columbia Records albums